Amara otiosa is a species of seed-eating ground beetle in the family Carabidae. It is found in North America.

References

Further reading

 

otiosa
Articles created by Qbugbot
Beetles described in 1918